Dzido is a Polish surname. Notable people with the surname include:

Jadwiga Dzido (1918–1985), Polish resistance worker and pharmacy student 
Marta Dzido (born 1981), Polish writer and documentary filmmaker

Polish-language surnames